Articulationes membri liberi may refer to:

 Articulationes membri inferioris liberi
 Articulationes membri superioris liberi